Christina Storm (born 1 April 1974), is a South African actress, model and entrepreneur. She is best known for her fashion modelling and dominated commercials with more than 200 television commercials. In acting, she is known for the roles she starred in the films Kite (2014), Eternity (2010) and Ek Lief Jou.

Personal life
Storm was born on 1 April 1974 in Pretoria, South Africa. When she was young, her parents separated, where her father moved to overseas. Then her mother, who was a gypsy, remarried. Therefore, she had a tourist-like life where she attended nine different schools for education.

She was in a relationship with former Springbok rugby player James Small for ten years, where she has one child, Ruby Cina Small. However, they had constant break-ups particularly physical assault on Christina. The relationship finally ended citing domestic violence. On 10 July 2019, Small died in hospital at the age of 50, after suffering a heart attack while having drinks at The Harem, a strip club in Johannesburg. Club co-owner, Jerome Saffi, confirmed that Small had collapsed while having drinks at the bar. An autopsy revealed the cause of death as ischeamic heart disease, and the police investigation into the circumstances surrounding his death revealed no suspicious circumstances. After seven months of dating, she married Paul Nel with the wedding ceremony took place on the 9 of October 2013. The couple have three children: Eve, Erin and Vince. Paul is a manager at Kong Experience Engineers and the owner of three businesses: Café Mexicho, Showco and Presentech.

In late 2020, she suffered from depression and anxiety and later followed by rehabilitation program.

Career
As a successful model, she appeared several times in popular magazine covers such as: "Elle" in May 1997, "SL" in October 1999, "South Africa: Sports Illustrated" swimwear in 1999, "Gentlemen Quarterly" (GQ) in 1999 and "Playboy" in September 2011.

In 2007, she made her maiden television acting with the M-Net soap opera Egoli. In the serial, she played the role of "Bienkie Naude". In 2010, she acted in the serials Jacket Dance and Wild at heart, where she portrayed the character "Sammi". In the same year, she starred in the film Jakhalsdan with the role "Vanessa Ruiters" and then in the film Eternity as "Lisa". After that, she joined with M-Net reality program Survivor South Africa: Santa Carolina as one of the celebrity contestants.

In 2011, she acted in the film I Love You by playing the role of "Lisa Sneiders". In the preceding years, she made many film appearances such as: Stealing time (2013), Kite (2014) with the role "Sawa’s mother", Everything crazy (2014) as "Elzaan Mostert", The Ghost Of Uniondale (2014) as "Tanie Miempie".

Filmography

References

External links
 IMDb

Living people
South African film actresses
People from Pretoria
1974 births